Patara was a small ancient city in ancient Cappadocia or Lesser Armenia, (Tab. Peut.), later in Pontus. The city lay on the major trade road from Trapezus on the Black Sea to Satala, and thence to Lake Van.

Its site is located near Madenhanları, Asiatic Turkey.

References

Ancient Greek archaeological sites in Turkey
Populated places in ancient Cappadocia
Populated places in ancient Pontus
Former populated places in Turkey
History of Gümüşhane Province